Boothville may refer to the following places:

Boothville, Louisiana, United States
Boothville, Northamptonshire, Northamptonshire England
Boothville, Ontario, a community in Southgate, Canada
Boothville-Venice, Louisiana, United States
Boothville House, Former Salvation Army maternity hospital in Brisbane, Queensland, Australia